Alahalli  is a village in the southern state of Karnataka, India. It is located in the Bangalore South taluk of Bangalore Urban district in Karnataka.

Demographics
 India census, Alahalli had a population of 7137 with 3590 males and 3547 females.

References

External links
 https://web.archive.org/web/20071116153217/http://bangaloreurban.nic.in/

Villages in Bangalore Urban district